Iji or IJI may refer to:

 Iji (video game), a freeware videogame 
 Iranian Journal of Immunology, a quarterly journal concerned with immunology
 Islami Jamhoori Ittehad, a political party in Pakistan